Hura is a Bedouin village in the Southern District of Israel.

Hura may also refer to:

 Hura (plant), a genus of trees
 Hura, Purulia, a village in  West Bengal, India
 Hura (community development block)
 Hura (Vidhan Sabha constituency)
 Maata "Te Reo" Hura (1904–1991), president of the Ratana Church of New Zealand
 Sohrab Hura (born 1981), Indian photographer

See also

Huraa (disambiguation)
Hurra (disambiguation)